Serramonte is a large 1960s residential neighborhood developed by Fred and Carl Gellert and was one of the largest construction jobs in Northern California at the time. This region of Daly City located near Colma which was a former ranch of 900 acres south of San Francisco, California, is also home to numerous shopping malls, strip malls, and big box retailers. When it was still being constructed at the time, locals resembled it to the adjacent Westlake Neighborhood which was developed by Henry Doelger as it made a huge impact in the city as it was like building a city within one. Serramonte is also home to thousands of Filipinos; once known as Serra-Manila. The nexus of Serramonte is Serramonte Center, originally opened in 1968, near the intersection of State Route 1 and Interstate 280, in the triangle formed by Callan Boulevard, Serramonte Boulevard, and Junipero Serra Boulevard which originally opened in 1968.

External links 
 Serramonte Center

Neighborhoods in Daly City, California
Junípero Serra